Kurlovo is the name of several inhabited localities in Russia.

Urban localities
Kurlovo (town), Vladimir Oblast, a town in Gus-Khrustalny District of Vladimir Oblast

Rural localities
Kurlovo, Kirov Oblast, a village in Kaksinvaysky Rural Okrug of Malmyzhsky District in Kirov Oblast
Kurlovo (rural locality), Vladimir Oblast, a village in Gus-Khrustalny District of Vladimir Oblast